Polonium dioxide (also known as polonium(IV) oxide) is a chemical compound with the formula PoO2. It is one of three oxides of polonium, the other two being polonium monoxide (PoO) and polonium trioxide (PoO3). It is a pale yellow crystalline solid at room temperature. Under lowered pressure (such as a vacuum), it decomposes into elemental polonium and oxygen at 500 °C. It is the most stable oxide of polonium and is an interchalcogen.

Structure and appearance
At room temperature, polonium dioxide has a face-centered cubic (fluorite) crystal structure; upon heating to high temperatures, it crystallises in the tetragonal crystal system. The cubic form is pale yellow, while the tetragonal form is red. Polonium dioxide darkens upon heating, and is chocolate brown at its sublimation point, 885 °C. The ionic radius of the  ion is 1.02 or 1.04 Å; thus, the ratio of the ionic radii / is about 0.73, the lower limit of stability for the cubic crystal system, allowing polonium dioxide to have two modifications. When freshly prepared, polonium dioxide is always in the tetragonal form, and changes to the cubic form after being left to stand or after being cooled strongly.

Occurrence
Polonium dioxide does not occur naturally due to the scarcity of polonium in nature and the high temperatures (250 °C) required to form the dioxide.

Preparation
Polonium dioxide is prepared by reacting elemental polonium with oxygen at 250 °C or by thermal decomposition of polonium(IV) hydroxide (PoO(OH)2), or various polonium salts such as polonium disulfate (Po(SO4)2), polonium selenate (Po(SeO4)2), or polonium tetranitrate (Po(NO3)4).

Chemistry
When placed in hydrogen, polonium dioxide is slowly reduced to metallic polonium at 200 °C; the same reduction occurs at 250 °C in ammonia or hydrogen sulfide. When heated in sulfur dioxide at 250 °C, a white compound is formed, possibly a polonium sulfite. When polonium dioxide is hydrated, polonous acid (H2PoO3), a pale yellow, voluminous precipitate, is formed. Despite its name, polonous acid is an amphoteric compound, reacting with both acids and bases.

Halogenation of polonium dioxide with the hydrogen halides yields the polonium tetrahalides:

PoO2 + 4 HF → PoF4 + 2 H2O
PoO2 + 4 HCl → PoCl4 + 2 H2O
PoO2 + 4 HBr → PoBr4 + 2 H2O
PoO2 + 4 HI → PoI4 + 2 H2O

In reactions, polonium dioxide behaves very much like its homologue tellurium dioxide, forming Po(IV) salts; however, the acidic character of the chalcogen oxides decreases going down the group, and polonium dioxide and polonium(IV) hydroxide are much less acidic than their lighter homologues. For example, SO2, SO3, SeO2, SeO3 and TeO3 are acidic, but TeO2 is amphoteric, and PoO2, while amphoteric, even shows some basic character.

The reaction of polonium dioxide with potassium hydroxide or potassium nitrate in air gives the colourless potassium polonite (K2PoO3):

PoO2 + 2 KOH → K2PoO3 + H2O
PoO2 + 2 KNO3 → K2PoO3 + 2 NO

Polonium dioxide is closely related to the polonite anion, similar to the relationship between polonium trioxide and the polonate anion.

Applications
Polonium dioxide has no uses outside of basic research.

Precautions
All polonium compounds, such as polonium dioxide, are extremely radioactive and thus must be handled in a glove box. The glove box must further be enclosed in another box similar to the glove box, maintained at a slightly lower pressure than the glove box to prevent the radioactive materials from leaking out. Gloves made of natural rubber do not provide sufficient protection against the radiation from polonium; surgical gloves are necessary. Neoprene gloves shield radiation from polonium better than natural rubber.

References

Polonium compounds
Oxides
Interchalcogens